A kick space, also known as a toe kick or toe space, is recessed space at the base of most floor-mounted kitchen cabinets.

Description
Traditionally, a kick space is allowed for in modern cabinet designs by creating a separate, recessed platform upon which one's cabinetry may rest. The kick space is intended to prevent potential toe injuries and allow for closer proximity to a countertop (the toes being the furthest-extending ground-level human body parts).

Many homes take advantage of this space by installing heating or ventilation ducts here. It also provides the additional advantage of serving as a "bumper against over-zealous mopping and vacuuming".

History 
The kick space became more common in the 20th century. With a burgeoning middle class and advancements in industry and domesticity, countertops became a more prominent work surface. Whereas previously most standing crafts were done at tables, there developed a need for a work counter to which one could comfortably stand directly adjacent. As the name would suggest, the kick space provides a space in which one's toes can rest.

References

Toes
Cabinets (furniture)